Glide With Me is the debut studio album by Australian R&B and pop group CDB. The album was released in November 1995 on Sony Music Australia and it peaked at #6 in the Australia charts.

Track listing

Charts

Weekly charts

Year-end charts

Certifications

References

CDB (band) albums
1995 debut albums
Sony Music Australia albums